Los Villareales is a former census-designated place (CDP) in Starr County, Texas, United States. The population was 930 at the 2000 census.
The CDP was deleted prior to the 2010 census. Part was annexed to Rio Grande City and parts were taken to form all of La Escondida, La Esperanza, and Santel CDPs and parts of Mi Ranchito Estate and Ranchitos del Norte CDPs.

Geography
Los Villareales is located at  (26.401720, -98.878187).

According to the United States Census Bureau, the CDP has a total area of 20.5 square miles (53.1 km2), of which 20.5 square miles (53.0 km2) is land and 0.04 square mile (0.1 km2) (0.19%) is water.

Demographics
As of the census of 2000, there were 930 people, 238 households, and 211 families residing in the CDP. The population density was 45.4 people per square mile (17.5/km2). There were 286 housing units at an average density of 14.0/sq mi (5.4/km2). The racial makeup of the CDP was 75.59% White, 23.23% from other races, and 1.18% from two or more races. Hispanic or Latino of any race were 96.45% of the population.

There were 238 households, out of which 58.4% had children under the age of 18 living with them, 70.6% were married couples living together, 14.7% had a female householder with no husband present, and 11.3% were non-families. 10.9% of all households were made up of individuals, and 5.5% had someone living alone who was 65 years of age or older. The average household size was 3.91 and the average family size was 4.23.

In the CDP, the population was spread out, with 40.3% under the age of 18, 11.3% from 18 to 24, 26.5% from 25 to 44, 15.6% from 45 to 64, and 6.3% who were 65 years of age or older. The median age was 24 years. For every 100 females, there were 93.3 males. For every 100 females age 18 and over, there were 85.0 males.

The median income for a household in the CDP was $18,352, and the median income for a family was $20,063. Males had a median income of $16,250 versus $33,594 for females. The per capita income for the CDP was $5,763. About 39.5% of families and 45.6% of the population were below the poverty line, including 49.3% of those under age 18 and 31.6% of those age 65 or over.

Education
Most of Los Villareales is part of the Rio Grande City Consolidated Independent School District.

A small portion of the community is served by the Roma Independent School District. Zoned campuses in the Roma ISD portion include Anna S. Canavan Elementary School (pre-kindergarten), R.T. Barrera Elementary School (grades K-5), Ramiro Barrera Middle School (grades 6-8), and Roma High School  (grades 9-12).

References

Census-designated places in Starr County, Texas
Census-designated places in Texas